Crockett may refer to:

People and fictional characters
Crockett Gillmore (born 1991), American National Football League player
Crockett Johnson, pen name of David Johnson Liesk (1906-1975), American cartoonist and children's book illustrator
Crockett (surname), a list of persons and fictional characters with the surname

Places

United States
Crockett, California, a census-designated place
Crockett, Kentucky, an unincorporated community
Crockett, Texas, a city
Crockett, Virginia, an unincorporated community
Crockett, West Virginia, an unincorporated community
Crockett County, Tennessee
Crockett County, Texas
Fort Crockett, Galveston Island, Texas
Crockett Lake, Washington
Crockett Creek, Missouri

Antarctica
Mount Crockett, Ross Dependency

Other uses
Crockett Cup, professional wrestling event
Crockett High School (disambiguation)
Crockett State School, a juvenile correctional facility in Crockett, Texas
Crockett Street, Beaumont, Texas
, two US Navy ships

See also
Crocket, a hook-shaped decorative element common in Gothic architecture
Crockett Formation, a geologic formation in Texas
Crockett House (disambiguation)
The Crocketts, a Welsh band